The 2020 FIM Moto2 World Championship was a part of the 72nd F.I.M. Road Racing World Championship season. The season calendar has been significantly affected by the COVID-19 pandemic, leading to the cancellation or postponement of many races.

Enea Bastianini won the Moto2 championship with 7 podiums and 3 wins beating the championship runner up Luca Marini by 9 points.

Teams and riders

All teams used series-specified Dunlop tyres and Triumph 765cc 3-cylinder engines.

Team changes
 KTM withdrew from Moto2 to focus on their MotoGP and Moto3 programmes, resulting in the following:
 American Racing and Ajo Motorsport switched to using Kalex bikes.
 Ángel Nieto Team switched to Speed Up machines.
 Tech3 switched to a Moto3 programme.
 Sport organizer Dorna Sports have moved to prohibit single-entry teams, resulting in the following:
 Both Federal Oil Gresini Moto2 and Petronas Sprinta Racing expanded to two bikes for the first time since the 2014 season.
 Kiefer Racing and Tasca Racing Scuderia Moto2 withdrew from Moto2.
 Ángel Nieto Team reverted to their former name of Aspar.

Rider changes
 Sam Lowes moved from Gresini Racing to EG 0,0 Marc VDS, replacing Xavi Vierge, who moved to Petronas Sprinta Racing.
 Arón Canet moved up to Moto2, joining Aspar Team.
 Lorenzo Dalla Porta moved up to Moto2 with Italtrans Racing Team, replacing Andrea Locatelli, who moved to the Supersport World Championship.
 Jesko Raffin returned to Moto2 with NTS RW Racing GP, where he'd already ridden at the first three events and the last four races before Valencia in 2019 as a replacement rider for Steven Odendaal, whom he will also now replace permanently.
 Marco Bezzecchi moved to Sky Racing Team VR46, replacing Nicolò Bulega, who moved to Federal Oil Gresini Racing.
 Jake Dixon moved to Petronas Sprinta Racing, replacing Khairul Idham Pawi, who returned to Moto3.
 Marcos Ramírez moved up to Moto2, joining American Racing Team to replace Iker Lecuona, who moved up to MotoGP.
 Hafizh Syahrin returned to Moto2 after two seasons with Tech 3 in MotoGP, joining Aspar Team.
 Andi Farid Izdihar replaced Dimas Ekky Pratama at IDEMITSU Honda Team Asia.
 Edgar Pons returned to Moto2 full-time, joining Federal Oil Gresini Racing.
Simone Corsi returned to Forward Racing, replacing Dominique Aegerter who moved to MotoE. Previously Corsi had raced for Forward Racing between 2013 and 2015.
Kasma Daniel made his debut in Moto2, joining Onexox TKKR SAG Team from FIM CEV Moto2.
Augusto Fernández moved from Pons Racing to fill the empty seat at Marc VDS after Alex Márquez's promotion to MotoGP with Repsol Honda. His seat at Pons Racing was filled by Héctor Garzó.

Mid season changes
 Dominique Aegerter replaced Jesko Raffin at NTS RW Racing GP for three races while Raffin recovered from fatigue.
 Alejandro Medina replaced Hafizh Syahrin at Aspar Team Moto2 for the Styrian Grand Prix after Syahrin sustained injuries in a crash at the previous round.
 Jorge Martín missed both Misano rounds due to him testing positive for COVID-19. He was replaced by Mattia Pasini for the second round.
 Xavier Cardelús replaced Arón Canet at Aspar Team Moto2 for the Aragón and Teruel Grands Prix after Canet sustained injuries in a crash at the French round.

Calendar
The following Grands Prix are scheduled to take place in 2020:

The following rounds were included on the original calendar, but were cancelled in response to the COVID-19 pandemic:

Calendar changes
The Thailand Grand Prix was moved from being the 15th round of 2019 to the 2nd round of 2020. 
The Argentine Grand Prix and Grand Prix of the Americas swapped places in the calendar order.
The German Grand Prix and Dutch TT also swapped places, with Germany moving to 21 June, while the Assen round remained in its traditional position on the final weekend of June.
The Finnish Grand Prix was reintroduced to the calendar after a 38-year absence. The venue hosting the round will be the new Kymi Ring, instead of the Tampere Circuit used in 1962 and 1963 or the Imatra Circuit which hosted the round until 1982.
The Aragon Grand Prix was moved from the last week of September to the first week of October. It was later returned to its original schedule to allow for the rescheduled Thailand Grand Prix.

Calendar changes as a reaction to COVID-19 pandemic
The season calendar has been significantly affected by the COVID-19 pandemic, leading to the cancellation or postponement of many races.
The Qatar Grand Prix proceeded for Moto2 and Moto3 as planned despite cancellation of the premier class race, as the teams were already in Qatar for their final pre-season test before the quarantine measures were implemented.
The Thailand Grand Prix was postponed on 2 March due to COVID-19 concerns. It was later planned to take place on 4 October, shifting the Aragon Grand Prix forward by a week.
The Grand Prix of the Americas was postponed from 5 April to 15 November after the City of Austin implemented a state of emergency. The Valencian Grand Prix was subsequently shifted back by one week to 22 November to accommodate the Austin rescheduling.
The Argentine Grand Prix was postponed to 22 November, further shifting the finale in Valencia to 29 November.
The Spanish Grand Prix was postponed on 26 March.
The French Grand Prix was postponed on 2 April.
The Italian and Catalan Grands Prix were postponed on 7 April.
The German Grand Prix was postponed on 17 April after the German government announced a ban of all large gatherings until at least 31 August.
The Dutch TT was postponed on 23 April after the Dutch government announced a ban on all mass events until at least 1 September.
The Finnish Grand Prix was postponed on 24 April.
The German, Dutch and Finnish rounds were officially cancelled on 29 April. For the first time in the championship's history, the Dutch TT was absent from the calendar.
The British and Australian rounds were cancelled on 29 May.
The Japanese round was cancelled on 1 June.
The Italian round was officially cancelled on 10 June.
On 11 June, a new schedule based in Europe was announced. The season is to contain 5 "double-headers" on consecutive weekends at Jerez, Austria, Misano, Aragon, and Valencia to achieve a minimum of 13 races.
The European Grand Prix returned to the calendar for the first time since 1995, held at Ricardo Tormo Circuit as the first round of the Valencian double-header.
The Grand Prix of the Americas was officially cancelled on 8 July.
The Argentine, Thai and Malaysian rounds were officially cancelled on 31 July.
On 10 August, the Portuguese Grand Prix was announced to be staging the final race of the 2020 season at the Autódromo Internacional do Algarve in Portimão. It will mark the first Portuguese Grand Prix since 2012 when it was held at the Autódromo do Estoril. Portimão has been MotoGP's reserve track since 2017.

Results and standings

Grands Prix

Riders' standings
Scoring system
Points were awarded to the top fifteen finishers. A rider had to finish the race to earn points.

Constructors' standings
Each constructor received the same number of points as their best placed rider in each race.

Teams' standings
The teams' standings were based on results obtained by regular and substitute riders; wild-card entries were ineligible.

Notes

References

Moto2
Grand Prix motorcycle racing seasons